Jack O'Neill is a fictional character in the Stargate film and television series .

Jack O'Neill may also refer to:
Jack O'Neill (baseball) (1873–1935), Irish-American baseball player
Jack O'Neill (businessman) (1923–2017), American surfer and businessman, founder of O'Neill, the surfwear and equipment brand
Jack O'Neill (statistician) (1910–1998), Australian public servant
Jack O'Neill, American rock musician, member of Jackopierce

See also
John O'Neill (disambiguation)